Highway 171 (AR 171, Ark. 171, and Hwy. 171) is a designation for three state highways in Southwest Arkansas. One route of  runs from US Highway 67 (US 67) to Wine Dot Road near an industrial facility. A second route of  begins at Highway 84 in Malvern and runs east to Lake Catherine State Park. A third route of  begins at US Highway 270 (US 270) and runs north, with state maintenance ending at Tigre Mountain Road. All routes are maintained by the Arkansas State Highway and Transportation Department (AHTD).

History
The route was first designated on the January 1939 state highway map between Highway 84 in Malvern and Lake Catherine State Park at the county line. It was extended east deeper into the park in 1952. The segment between US 270 and the county line was added in June 1973 pursuant to Act 9 of 1973 by the Arkansas General Assembly. The final segment was added for industrial access from US 67 to a new Willamette Industries particleboard plant on March 6, 1986.

Major intersections

See also

References

External links

171
Transportation in Garland County, Arkansas
Transportation in Hot Spring County, Arkansas